The 2013 WAFF Championship is an international football tournament held in Qatar from 25 December 2013 to 7 January 2014. The nine national teams involved in the tournament were required to register a squad of 23 players, including three goalkeepers. Only players in these squads were eligible to take part in the tournament.

Group A

Qatar
Coach:  Djamel Belmadi

Palestine
Coach:  Jamal Mahmoud

Saudi Arabia
Coach: Khalid Al-Koroni

Group B

Bahrain
Coach:   Anthony Hudson

Iraq
Coach: Hadi Mutanash

Oman
Coach:  Philippe Burle

Group C

Jordan
Coach:   Hossam Hassan

Kuwait
Coach:  Jorvan Vieira

Lebanon
Coach:  Giuseppe Giannini

References

Squads
WAFF Championship squads